Oldervik (North Sami: Leaibbáš) is a fishing village in Tromsø Municipality in Troms og Finnmark county, Norway, about  northeast of the city of Tromsø. The Grøtsundet strait leading to the city of Tromsø joins the Ullsfjorden, just north of the village. The population of Oldervik (2001) is 131 people.

References

Villages in Troms
Tromsø
Populated places of Arctic Norway